Revd Dr. Rob Frost (27 April 1950 – 11 November 2007) was an English Christian evangelist, broadcaster and author who founded the Share Jesus International missionary agency.  He was national evangelist for the Methodist Church from 1986 to 2007.

Early life
Robert William Frost was born in Yorkshire. His father, Ronald Frost, was a Methodist minister, who inspired him to become an evangelist. He trained as a Methodist minister himself at Hartley Victoria College in Manchester in the early 1970s.

His first ministerial posting was for three churches in the Pontefract area in 1975 before moving to Tooting, London, in 1979, from where he went on to continue his Methodist ministry around south London. He founded the huge Methodist celebration, Easter People in 1988, and was its executive Director for almost 20 years. He and some close friends had used their life-savings to fund the deposit on Camber Sands holiday camp where the first event was held. With 900 attending, it was a success, and the savings were repaid. Tens of thousands of people took part in the following years, with speakers and performers who included Dr Donald English, Adrian Plass, Simeon Wood, Rev Howard Mellor, Dr Elaine Storkey, Revd Dr David Wilkinson, Paul Field, Springs Dance Company and the Methodist Youth Brass Band.  
Following gaining his PhD from King's College London in 1995, Dr Frost lectured in mission and evangelism at London School of Theology and several other theological institutions throughout the U.K.

Broadcasting and media
Dr Frost wrote more than twenty theological and devotional books, including a handful of Christian novels and presented Frost on Sunday on Premier Radio for many years.

He used his media presence to advance the cause of Release International, a charity which campaigns on behalf of persecuted Christians and of which he was Honorary President from 2004.

Death and legacy
Frost was diagnosed with skin cancer in June 2007 and began treatment.    He was taken into hospital on 7 November 2007, as his condition worsened and shortly later died from liver failure as a result of a secondary melanoma. He is survived by his wife Jacqui, and his sons Chris and Andy.

Over 2,000 people attended his memorial service at Central Hall, Westminster, on Saturday 12 January 2008.

References

External links
Share Jesus International.
Release International website.

1950 births
2007 deaths
Alumni of King's College London